Clickteam is a French software development company based in Boulogne-Billancourt, Hauts-de-Seine. Founded by Francis Poulain, François Lionet and Yves Lamoureux, Clickteam is best known for the creation of Clickteam Fusion, a script-free programming tool that allows users to create video games or other interactive software using a highly advanced event system.

History 
Before co-founding Clickteam, François Lionet was the programmer of STOS BASIC, a programming language released in 1988 for the Atari ST, and AMOS BASIC, a more advanced language released in 1990 for the Commodore Amiga. Both of these have since been released in open-source form on the Clickteam corporate website. Yves Lamoureux was also a successful game developer prior to co-founding Clickteam, working with multiple companies on games.

Clickteam's debut software was Klik & Play, released in 1994 as commercial, proprietary software. A version for educational use, dubbed Klik & Play For Schools, was also released as freeware, to be used exclusively for school activities. Klik & Play For Schools was available for download in Clickteam's website during the course of 2006, now being available for the public in general. Subsequent releases included, released in 1996, Clickteam's second product, Click and Create later renamed Multimedia Fusion Express which included more advanced features which the original Klik & Play lacked, such as scrolling, and a timeline editor, 3D game-making tool Jamagic; The Games Factory; The Games Factory 2; and Multimedia Fusion.

Clickteam's most recent application is Clickteam Fusion 2.5 (CF 2.5). This title is the successor to Multimedia Fusion 2, the company's most well-received software application to date.

In September 2016, Clickteam partnered with the Humble Bundle and offered a Fusion 2.5 centered bundle. Around ten games and Fusion 2.5 with various export modules were offered in the "Clickteam Fusion 2.5 Bundle". Notably, for several games the source code was included.

In 2019, Clickteam released a new DLC for Clickteam Fusion 2.5, named Clickteam Fusion 2.5+. It introduced new features such as child events, which only run if their parent events are true, support for DirectX11, new output window in the debugger, a profiler, and more. The aim of Clickteam Fusion 2.5+ was to make it easier to manage and organize large projects, as well as to improve performance of games created with the software.

Products 
The Fusion series was designed to be a user-friendly yet powerful drag-and-drop game and application creation program, easily accessible to either those well-versed or inexperienced in programming.

Software and video game development software 
 Klik & Play (KnP) - originally created by Europress Software (Francois Lionet/Yves Lamoureux 1994)
 Click and Create - later renamed Multimedia Fusion Express
 The Games Factory
 The Games Factory 2
 Multimedia Fusion
 Multimedia Fusion 2
 Clickteam Fusion 2.5

Runtime export modules for Clickteam Fusion 2.5 are available for Adobe Flash, iOS, XNA, Android, HTML5, UWP and MacOS.

Other products 
 Install Creator (previously Install Maker)
 Patch Maker
 SynchronX (directory synchronization)
 Jamagic

Vitalize! was another product offered by Clickteam and discontinued in 2012, functioning as a browser plugin similar to Adobe Flash Player, Adobe Shockwave Player and Microsoft Silverlight.

Games made with Clickteam tools 

Some of the most notable games made using Clickteam's software are:
 Five Nights at Freddy's series (2014-)
 Trap Adventure 2 (2016)
 The Sea Will Claim Everything (2012) - made in Clickteam Fusion Developer 2.5 by Jonas Kyratzes
 Freedom Planet (2014)
 I Wanna Be the Guy (2007) – made in Multimedia Fusion 2
 The Escapists (2015)
 Spark the Electric Jester (2017)
 Baba Is You (2019) – made in Multimedia Fusion 2

References

Bibliography 
 

Video game IDE
Video game engines
Video game development software
Video game companies of France
Video game companies established in 1993
French companies established in 1993